Bost University, in Lashkargah, Helmand Province, Afghanistan is a private institution of higher education founded by Ahmad Jan Popal in 2010. Bost University offers two to six-year undergraduate degrees and diplomas. Four to six-year undergraduate programs are included in engineering, law and political science, economics, medicine, computer science, and education.

Certificates for short-term courses and training that are three years or less are part of the university's Institute of Health Science such as midwife, nursing, laboratory, physiotherapy, dentistry and pharmacy.

History
From the beginning, it was the Bost Institute of Higher Education. In 2013 the Ministry of Higher Education Quality Commission Board investigated all the private universities in the country. In 2015 the board announced its results and Bost Institute of Higher Education got the top marks (88.3) and was announced the top university of all private universities in Afghanistan.

The Ministry of Higher Education promoted the university to Bost University (بُست پوهنتون) awarded in November 2015.

Faculties and departments
 Faculty of Law and Political Science
Law
Management (Political Science)
 Bachelor of Business Administration
Management
 Faculty of Engineering
Architecture
Civil
Mechanical
Electrical Engineering
 Faculty of Medicine, six-year program in General Medicine
 Faculty of Computer Science
Hardware
Software
 Faculty of Computer Science
Software
Hardware
Networking & Database
 Faculty of Education
Physic
Chemistry
Math
Biology
Pashto

Institute of Health Science
 Nursing (NRS): a three-year program
 Midwife (MW): two-year program
 Laboratory (LAB): two-year program
 Pharmacy (PHR): two-year program
 Physiotherapy (PTR): two-year program
 Dentistry (DNT): two-year program

Library
The library has more than 8000 Pashto, Dari, and English books.

Laboratory
The university has a laboratory for its engineering faculty students.

See also 
List of universities in Afghanistan

References
Official website of Ministry of Higher Education

External links

Official website of Bost University

List of universities in Afghanistan

Universities in Afghanistan
Buildings and structures in Helmand Province
2012 establishments in Afghanistan